Brian Emrich (born April 14, 1961) is a sound designer, composer, and musician.  His sound design credits include the films π, Requiem for a Dream, One Hour Photo and Phone Booth.  He records music under the moniker Psilonaut, and has collaborated with Foetus and Congo Norvell.

He was nominated at the Broadcast Critic Awards for his work on the film Black Swan.

References

External links

American male composers
21st-century American composers
Living people
1961 births
People from Ballston, New York
21st-century American male musicians